The men's decathlon event at the 2006 African Championships in Athletics was held at the Stade Germain Comarmond on August 9–10.

Medalists

Results

100 metres
Wind:Heat 1: -3.4 m/s, Heat 2: -2.3 m/s

Shot put

Shot put

High jump

400 metres

110 metres hurdles
Wind:Heat 1: -1.9 m/s, Heat 2: -2.0 m/s

Discus throw

Pole vault

Javelin throw

1500 metres

Final standings

References
Results 
Results

2006 African Championships in Athletics
Combined events at the African Championships in Athletics